The Richard K. Yancey Wildlife Management Area, formally the Red River/Three Rivers Wildlife Management Area, is a  69,806-acre tract of protected area in lower Concordia Parish Louisiana. The area is owned by the Louisiana Department of Wildlife and Fisheries and the U.S. Army Corps of Engineers (USACOE).

Description

The WMA consists of a mixture of bottomland hardwood trees that includes bitter pecan, overcup oak, nuttall oak, bald cypress, sweet pecan tree, honey locust, hackberry, sycamore, green ash, cottonwood tree (Populus heterophylla or possibly Populus heterophylla), and willow trees. The land is flat and poorly drained, including swampland, with many lakes and bayous. Wildlife includes deer, turkey, squirrel, rabbit, waterfowl, woodcock, dove, and snipe. Furbearers are the raccoon, mink, nutria, beaver, bobcat, fox, otter, and coyote.  There is an annual public alligator lottery and fishing includes bass, bluegill, crappie, and catfish. Commercial fishing offers buffalo (considered a rough fish to anglers), carp (also a rough fish), drum (fish), gar, bowfin, and catfish.

History

Three Rivers Wildlife Management Area consisted of 26,295 acres owned by the LDWF and 1,085 acres owned by the USACOE totaling 27,380 acres before the merge.

Merge and name change

Richard K. Yancey (1925–2013) worked for the Louisiana Department of Wildlife and Fisheries from 1948 to 1979. After being promoted to assistant secretary of the Office of Wildlife he was active in creating the Tensas River National Wildlife Refuge and Big Lake Wildlife Management Area. "Dick" Yancey was referred to as the "great duck man" and made a video sponsored by Ducks Unlimited supporting the Louisiana duck hunting season for 1965–1966 as well as the September teal season. The Bureau of Sport Fisheries and Wildlife was against extending the 1965–66 Teal season that Yancey pushed for but it became a reality.

The LDWF commission unanimously passed a resolution to change the name of the consolidated WMA's to the current name.

Current

After the consolidation, the WMA was increased to 57,004 acres owned by the LDWF and 12,802 acres owned by the USCOE for a total of 69,806 acres as of 2016. The 2016–2017 September Teal season (Blue-winged, Green-winged, and Cinnamon only) ran from September 10 to the 25th.

See also

List of Louisiana Wildlife Management Areas

References

Wildlife management areas of the United States
Wildlife management areas of Louisiana
Protected areas of Louisiana
Geography of Concordia Parish, Louisiana